Petrogradskaya is a station on the Moskovsko-Petrogradskaya Line of the Saint Petersburg Metro.

The station was opened on July 1, 1963. The name was given by its location on Petrograskaya Storona and  Petrogradskiy district

The ground vestibule is by architects Andreev and Moskalenko, and is in the building of "Dom mod" ("House of Fashions"), at the intersection of Kamennoostrovsky prospect and Big prospect of Petrogradskaya Storona, near Leon Tolstoy square. There is underground slope to a pedestrian subway (originally with escalators, dismantled later).

Petrogradskaya is station of deep location with platform screen doors. Underground hall was designed by architects Belov, Govorkovsky, Rivin, Tregubov and Shimakovsky. Crimped surface of the walls is tiled with ceramics. Rear wall is decorated with panel against the blue grating background with profiles of worker and kolkhoz woman, which expose the theme of revolutionary Petrograd.

According to the most recent version of the system expansion plan, Petrogratskaya will become a transfer station, connected to the future Koltsevaya Line.

From January 5, 2013, till November 2013, the station was closed for capital repair.

References

Literature

External links
 Petrogradskaya at metro-spb.nwd.ru 
 Petrogradskaya at ometro.net 
 Saint Petersburg. Petrograd. Leningrad: Encyclopedic reference book. Petrogradskaya 

Saint Petersburg Metro stations
Railway stations in Russia opened in 1963
1963 establishments in the Soviet Union
Railway stations located underground in Russia
Kamennoostrovsky Prospekt